Song Qiang is a co-author of China Can Say No and The Way Out For China: Under the Shadow of Globalization. He keeps a Chinese language blog, 开花の身体, in which he intersperses musings on the culinary arts with nationalist-themed rhetoric.

References

External links
 开花の身体

People's Republic of China essayists
Living people
Year of birth missing (living people)